Dr. William J. McGuigan (July 18, 1853 – December 25, 1908) was the tenth Mayor of Vancouver, British Columbia and served one term in 1904. He was born in Stratford, Ontario and was buried in Mountain View Cemetery in Vancouver.

References
Mountain View Cemetery, Vancouver: William McGuigan, accessed 3 August 2006

1853 births
1908 deaths
Lawyers in British Columbia
Physicians from British Columbia
Canadian people of Irish descent
Mayors of Vancouver
People from Stratford, Ontario
Burials at Mountain View Cemetery (Vancouver)
20th-century Canadian politicians